Psaphis was originally a town of the Oropia, but subsequently a deme of ancient Attica. It lay between Oropus and Brauron, and was the last demus in the north-eastern district of Attica.

The site of Psaphis is tentatively located at Revithia or Limnionas.

References

Populated places in ancient Attica
Former populated places in Greece
Demoi